Václav Straka (born May 24, 1978) is a Czech handball
player, currently playing for MškJ Považska bystrica in the Slovak Extraliga.
He also played for HC Frýdek-Místek, MŠK Považská Bystrica and HC Dukla Prague.

References 

Czech male handball players
Living people
1978 births
People from Tábor
Sportspeople from the South Bohemian Region